Shirley Eclipse Brick (June 20, 1898 – January 3, 1929) was an American football end who played college football for Rice and one game in the American Professional Football Association (APFA) for the Buffalo All-Americans.

Early life and education
Shirley Brick was born on June 20, 1898, in San Antonio, Texas. He attended North Side High School in Fort Worth, Texas, and was president of his class. At the time of his graduation, Brick was the youngest ever graduate of the school, at age 16, and also posted their highest average with 94.2. He joined Rice University in 1915, seeing immediate playing time as a freshman on the football team. Following his junior year, Brick was named first-team all-state at the left-end position. Shortly after the selection, the team unanimously elected him team captain for the 1918 season. An article in The Houston Post said the following:

Brick was a member of the Kelly Field military service team in 1918 rather than Rice, scoring two touchdowns in a victory against his former team.

He returned to Rice for his senior year of 1919, and named team captain after the resignation of Emmett McFarland. In addition to playing end, Brick handled the team's kicking duties.

Professional career
After graduation, Brick was named assistant coach at his alma mater of Rice University; however, he changed his mind shortly before the season started. Instead, he moved to East Aurora, New York, and played professional football for the Buffalo All-Americans in the American Professional Football Association (APFA). Brick appeared in one game with the team, a 43–7 victory over the Columbus Panhandles as a substitute.

Death
Brick was burned to death in a fire at Salamanca, New York, on January 3, 1929. He was 30 at the time of his death.

References

1898 births
1929 deaths
Players of American football from Texas
American football ends
Rice Owls football players
Buffalo All-Americans players
Deaths from fire in the United States